David Driessen (born 24 November 1994) is a Dutch football player.

Club career
He made his professional debut in the Eerste Divisie for Achilles '29 on 13 January 2017 in a game against Fortuna Sittard.

References

External links
 Profile @ Voetbal International
 
 

1994 births
Living people
Footballers from Venlo
Association football forwards
Dutch footballers
Achilles '29 players
Eerste Divisie players